The 1st Aerobic Gymnastics World Championships were held in Paris, France on 16 and 17 December 1995.

Results

Men's Individual

Women's Individual

Mixed Pair

Trio

Medal table 

Aerobic Gymnastics World Championships
Aerobic Gymnastics World Championships
Aerobic Gymnastics World Championships
Aerobic Gymnastics World Championships
International gymnastics competitions hosted by France